The table below lists the judgments of the Constitutional Court of South Africa delivered in 2005.

The members of the court at the start of 2005 were Chief Justice Arthur Chaskalson, Deputy Chief Justice Pius Langa, and judges Tholie Madala, Yvonne Mokgoro, Dikgang Moseneke, Sandile Ngcobo, Kate O'Regan, Albie Sachs, Thembile Skweyiya, Johann van der Westhuizen and Zak Yacoob. Chief Justice Chaskalson retired in May, and Deputy Chief Justice Langa was elevated to Chief Justice while Justice Moseneke was elevated to Deputy Chief Justice.

References
 
 

2005
Constitutional Court
Constitutional Court of South Africa